Isoplectron is a genus of cave wētā in the family Rhaphidophoridae with three species currently recognized. The genus is endemic to New Zealand and distributed throughout the country.

Taxonomy and morphology 
The genus Isoplectron was described by Hutton in 1896.  All species in this genus are small in size (10-17mm body length) and are commonly misidentified as a result of increased undescribed species. The fore femora of the Isoplectron does not contain apical spines, in addition, the hind tibiae models two pairs of apical spines. Adult females have a broad bilobed subgenital plate while males have a triangular shape. Multiple species are undescribed and are not able to reflect the fauna presently however, descriptions relating to Isoplectron armatum, Isoplectron calcaratum and Isoplectron aciculatum have been made.

Isoplectron armatum 
Isoplectron armatum are the most commonly observed species of Isoplectron. They are found across New Zealand but are more concentrated around Dunedin and can be found in dry spaces under bark or in holes of various trees, especially Nothofagus cliffortioides and Kanuka. They are also caught in pitfall traps in southern North Island forests. Their morphology consists of a body length between 11-17mm, short dorsal and laterals in the hind tibial apical spurs, a very small ventral pair of hind tibial apical spurs and no spinules in the hind tarsal plantulae. This is consistent across males and females.

Isoplectron calcaratum 
This species overlaps in habitat and morphology with their close relative Isoplectron armatum and have been observed in the north of the South Island and Wellington.

Isoplectron/Setasutum pallidum 
Described by Aola Richards in 1972. Limited descriptions and studies have been made on Setasutum pallidum (which might belong in the genus Isoplectron) however they are claimed to be an alpine species with observations in the South Island occurring.

Species 
 Isoplectron aciculatum Karny, 1937
 Isoplectron armatum Hutton, 1897
 Isoplectron calcaratum Hutton, 1897

Predation 
A study conducted by Bremner et al. (1989) compared insect response to disturbance (touch) between individuals living with mammalian predators and those on mammal-free islands. Wētā were observed to jump away or leap off tree branches when disturbed in environments with rodents, but were more likely to move away without haste in environments without rodents. The paper concluded that invertebrate populations, specifically the Isoplectron sp. population in Fiordland, altered their behaviour in environments that contained predators such as stoats (Mustela erminea) and ship rats (Rattus rattus) in comparison to predator free environments. Individuals within the genus Isoplectron are eaten by endemic reptiles such as the Tuatara (Sphenodon), spotted skink (Leiolopisma infrapunctatum) and Pacific geckos (Hoplodactylus pacificus) as well as avian species such as Riflemen (Acanthissitta chloris), Ruru (Ninox novaeseelandiae), Kākā (Nestor meridionalis) and Tieke (Philesturnus).

Conservation 
All species within the genus Isoplectron are considered not threatened and are consequently of little conservation concern.

References 

 Peripatus
 

Ensifera genera
Cave weta
Endemic fauna of New Zealand
Endemic insects of New Zealand